Domadugu is a census town in Sangareddy district of the Indian state of Telangana.

Geography 

Accessibility
Domadugu is 37 km from Hyderabad and can be reached by TSRTC buses.

Neighborhoods
Gummadidala, Annaram, Bonthapally , Dundigal

References 

Cities and towns in Sangareddy district